Kankanalapalli (or Kankanala Palle) (Village ID 590031) is a village in Sattenapalli mandal, Guntur district in the state of Andhra Pradesh, India. According to the 2011 census it has a population of 3460 living in 923 households.

Most residents are farmers who do cultivation of chili, cotton, and paddy.

Rail - The nearest Railway station Sattenapalli.

Temples: Sri Brahmamgari temple & Sri Veeranjaneya Swamy temple

President (sarpanch): Kobbari subbarao

MPTC : Patcha Sudheer

References

Villages in Guntur district